Paphinia levyae is a species of orchid endemic to Ecuador.

This plant was described in 1999.

Varieties include var. angustisegmentata.

References

External links 

levyae
Endemic orchids of Ecuador
Plants described in 1999